Augustinus Franz Kropfreiter (9 September 1936 – 26 September 2003) was member of the Austrian , composer and organist.

Life 
Born in Hargelsberg, Kropfreiter spent his school years from 1948 at the Catholic Bischöfliches Gymnasium Petrinum, where he received his first basic musical education. Immediately after the Matura he entered the Augustiner-Chorherrenstift St. Florian in 1953, where he was initially taught music theory by Johann Krichbaum. From 1955 to 1960 he studied composition and organ at the Linz Anton Bruckner Private University and at the University of Music and Performing Arts Vienna. After completing his studies, he worked as an organist in Sankt Florian. Along the way he was also a teacher of the St. Florian Boys' Choir and, from 1966, director of the monastery choir (Regens Chori).

Kropfreiter died in 2003 in Sankt Florian at the age of 68.

Works 
Kropfreiter created an extensive organ oeuvre and is thus one of the most important Austrian organ composers of the 20th century. He helped The St. Florian Monastery to even greater fame.
He composed several orchestral works (among others organ concertos, 3 symphonies), masses, church music, choral music, chamber music and organ pieces (among others Toccata francese, Signum, Numerous chorale arrangements of varying degrees of difficulty), with which he achieved fame not only in Austria. In his compositions, he attached great importance to polytonality and hindemithian counterpoint.

Awards 
 1962: Kulturpreis des Landes Oberösterreich
 1964: Staatspreis für Musik
 1993: Anton Bruckner Prize
 2001: Austrian Decoration for Science and Art I. Klasse.
 2002: .
 2002: Heinrich Gleißner Prize.

References

Further reading 
 
 Maria Helfgott: Das Orgelwerk von Augustinus Franz Kropfreiter. Diplomarbeit University of Vienna 2000.

External links 
 
 aeiou – Kropfreiter, Augustinus Franz
 komponisten.at – Augustinus Franz Kropfreiter
 Bibliografie zu Augustinus Franz Kropfreiter
 Kropfreiter spielt Orgelwerke von Anton Bruckner
 

20th-century Austrian composers
20th-century Austrian male musicians
Austrian organists
20th-century classical composers
Recipients of the Austrian Cross of Honour for Science and Art, 1st class
1936 births
2003 deaths
People from Linz-Land District